Storrington and Sullington is the name of a civil parish in the Horsham District of West Sussex, England.

In the 2001 census 6074 people lived in 2778 households of whom 2563 were economically active. At the 2011 Census the population had increased to 6,966. In 2018 there was a recorded 8,955 people living in the Storrington area.

See also
Storrington
Sullington

References

External links
Official Storrington & Sullington Parish Council Website

Civil parishes in West Sussex